Kieron T. Fonotia (born 2 February 1988) is a former New Zealand born Samoan rugby union player who played as a Centre for the Tasman Mako in the Bunnings NPC.

Career

On 16 June 2017, Fonotia made his debut for the Samoa national rugby union team after qualifying for selection through his Grandfather.

Fonotia returned to New Zealand in 2020 after he was cut from Welsh side Scarlets. He was part of the  side that won the Mitre 10 Cup for the second time in a row in 2020.

References

External links
 

Living people
1988 births
Samoan rugby union players
Rugby union centres
Tasman rugby union players
Crusaders (rugby union) players
Rugby union players from Christchurch
Ospreys (rugby union) players
Samoa international rugby union players
Scarlets players